Eriosolena is a genus of flowering plants belonging to the family Thymelaeaceae.

Its native range is Eastern Himalaya to Southern Central China and Western Malesia.

Species:

Eriosolena composita 
Eriosolena involucrata

References

Thymelaeaceae
Malvales genera